The Batin are a sub-group of Malay people that inhabits the interior parts of Jambi province

There are approximately 72,000 Batin living in the interior of south-central Sumatra. They speak a dialect of the Jambi variant of Malay, but the accent is similar to Minangkabau language.

The Batin are predominantly Muslim, but have a matrilineal kinship system, which is similar to Minangkabau than to Jambi Malays.

References

Further reading
 Nuh, M. Imran (2000) Budaya masyarakat suku bangsa Batin di Kabupaten Bungo Tebo, Propinsi Jambi Proyek Pengkajian dan Pembinaan Nilai-Nilai Budaya Daerah, Direktorat Sejarah dan Nilai Tradisional, Direktorat Jenderal Kebudayaan, Jakarta;

Indigenous peoples of Southeast Asia
Ethnic groups in Indonesia
Ethnic groups in Sumatra
Muslim communities of Indonesia
Malay people